Novogurovsky is an urban locality (a work settlement) in Aleksinsky District of Tula Oblast, Russia. Population:

Administrative and municipal status
Within the framework of administrative divisions, Novogurovsky is incorporated within Aleksinsky District as an urban-type settlement. As a municipal division, the work settlement of Novogurovsky is incorporated as Novogurovsky Urban Okrug.

References

Notes

Sources

Urban-type settlements in Tula Oblast
